Podpesochny is a rural locality (a khutor) in Stezhenskoye Rural Settlement, Alexeyevsky District, Volgograd Oblast, Russia. The population was 53 as of 2010.

Geography 
Podpesochny is located on the left bank of the Khopyor River, 16 km southwest of Alexeyevskaya (the district's administrative centre) by road. Stezhensky is the nearest rural locality.

References 

Rural localities in Alexeyevsky District, Volgograd Oblast